The 1934 Creighton Bluejays football team was an American football team that represented Creighton University as a member of the Missouri Valley Conference (MVC) during the 1934 college football season. In its first and only season under head coach Eddie Hickey, the team compiled a 2–7 record (2–1 against MVC opponents) and was outscored by a total of 151 to 44. The team played its home games at Creighton Stadium in Omaha, Nebraska.

Schedule

References

Creighton
Creighton Bluejays football seasons
Creighton Bluejays football